Joseph Gikonyo Mukinyi (born 7 February 1965) is a former Kenyan athlete who competed in the 100 and 200 metres. He was the Kenyan record holder in both distances with 10.28 seconds and 20.43 seconds respectively. The 100 metres national record has since been broken by Tom Musinde, who ran 10.26 at the 2007 All-Africa Games He also competed in the men's 200 metres at the 1996 Summer Olympics.

In 2002, Gikonyo was described as a semi-retired athlete.

Achievements
1995 All-Africa Games - bronze medal (200 m)
1990 African Championships - gold medal (100 m)
1990 African Championships - gold medal (200 m)

References

External links

1965 births
Living people
Kenyan male sprinters
Athletes (track and field) at the 1990 Commonwealth Games
Athletes (track and field) at the 1994 Commonwealth Games
Commonwealth Games competitors for Kenya
African Games bronze medalists for Kenya
African Games medalists in athletics (track and field)
Athletes (track and field) at the 1996 Summer Olympics
Olympic athletes of Kenya
Athletes (track and field) at the 1995 All-Africa Games